Solemn Meditation is the third album led by jazz pianist Paul Bley featuring tracks recorded in 1957 and released on the GNP Crescendo label.

Reception

Allmusic awarded the album 3 stars stating "This early quartet date from pianist Paul Bley is somewhat historic because it was the recording debut of both bassist Charlie Haden and vibraphonist Dave Pike... Bley explores a lot of unlikely material in an early postbop manner".

Track listing
All compositions by Paul Bley except as indicated
 "Birk's Works" (Dizzy Gillespie) - 6:05  
 "O Plus One" (Carla Borg) - 3:15  
 "Porgy" (Jimmy McHugh) - 3:40  
 "Solemn Meditation" (Sam Gill) - 3:33  
 "I Remember Harlem" (Roy Eldridge, Bob Astor, George Williams) - 3:41  
 "Drum Two" - 3:05  
 "Everywhere" (Bill Harris) - 4:03  
 "Beau Diddley" - 5:33  
 "Persian Village" (Dave Pike)  3:16

Personnel 
Paul Bley - piano
Dave Pike - vibraphone
Charlie Haden - bass  
Lennie McBrowne - drums

References 

1958 albums
Paul Bley albums
GNP Crescendo Records albums